Sviatoslav of Kiev may refer to:

 Sviatoslav I of Kiev (c. 942–972)
 Sviatoslav II of Kiev (1027–1076) 
 Sviatoslav III of Kiev (died 1194)